Joughin is a Manx surname. Notable people with the surname include:

Charles Joughin (1878–1956), English-American chef
John Joughin, ex Vice-Chancellor of the University of East London
Jonathan Joughin, Manx Member of the House of Keys
Sierah Joughin (1996–2016), American woman who was abducted and murdered in Delta, Ohio
Steve Joughin (born 1959), Manx cyclist

See also 
Joughin Glacier

Surnames of Manx origin